Viktor Dementyev (Russian: Виктор Дементьев; born 21 April 1945) is a Soviet rower. He competed at the 1972 Summer Olympics in Munich with the men's eight where they came fourth.

References

1945 births
Living people
Soviet male rowers
Olympic rowers of the Soviet Union
Rowers at the 1972 Summer Olympics